Walter Venter (born 7 August 1984) is former a South African rugby union footballer. His regular playing position was centre.

He announced his retirement in 2013 due to a cruciate knee ligament injury.

References

External links
 
 itsrugby.co.uk profile

Living people
1984 births
South African rugby union players
Rugby union centres
Griquas (rugby union) players
Golden Lions players
Lions (United Rugby Championship) players
Leopards (rugby union) players
Falcons (rugby union) players
University of Johannesburg alumni
Rugby union players from the Free State (province)